Ford Escort WRC is a rally vehicle based on the Ford Escort RS Cosworth with World Rally Car homologation. It was built by M-Sport to compete in the World Rally Championship for the Ford World Rally Team. It replaced the group A version that the brand had used since 1993 and was later replaced by the Ford Focus WRC in 1999.

Competition history

1997 
The car was presented at the end of the 1996 Rally de Catalunya, the last race of the Group A cars, but unlike the rival Subaru Impreza, the Escort is almost a Group A further evolved according to the specific technical regulations of the World Rally Car.

The car made its debut at the 1997 Monte Carlo Rally, with the two factory drivers Carlos Sainz and Armin Schwarz. Sainz immediately wins a good second place behind Piero Liatti, a result that the Spaniard will repeat also in Sweden. At the Safari Rally Sainz retired due to a mechanical problem while Schwarz finished fourth, the German then finished 3rd in Portugal with Sainz again out of the race. In Spain both Escorts do not score points but Sainz hits the second position in Corsica.

From the next race, the Rally of Argentina, Ford replaces Armin Schwarz with the expert Juha Kankkunen, who obtained good results from the beginning, in Greece at the Acropolis Rally Ford made a double with Sainz first in front of Kankkunen; in New Zealand they finish in the same order 2nd and 3rd and in the New Zealand round the Escort WRC is updated and thanks to the FIA homologation of 1 July 1997 it is equipped with a more modern and performing six-speed X-Trac sequential gearbox instead of the "H" linkage as well as numerous other evolutions on suspensions, electronic systems and electronic differential control. Subsequently Kankkunen finished second in Finland, and then at the Rally of Indonesia Ford made a double again with Sainz 1st and Kankkunen 2nd; will be Escort Wrc's last worldwide win.

The Fords are also fast in Sanremo where Sainz is 4th by a whisker and Kankkunen is 6th. In Australia Sainz is first when he retires, while in the last race of the year, in Wales, Kankkunen finishes 2nd ahead of Sainz 3

1998 
In 1998 Ford, after the passage of Carlos Sainz to Toyota, decided to field Juha Kankkunen and the Belgian Bruno Thiry, the latter already a pilot of the blue oval in the seasons '95 and '96 aboard the Ford Escort Group A. The season begins with the best conditions given the evolutions that Ford has made to the model, such as the new engine developed by Tom Walkinshaw's TWR, despite the close retirement to give way to the Ford Focus WRC.

The season starts well, Kankkunen finishes 2nd in Monte Carlo third in Sweden while Thiry finishes 6th and 8th respectively. At the Safari Rally and the Rally of Portugal, Bruno Thiry was replaced (due to injury) by Ari Vatanen, a great connoisseur of dirt roads. Vatanen finishes third in the challenging Safari where Kankkunen is 2nd, while in Portugal Vatanen is 5th and Kankkunen only 7th.

The next race, the Rally of Spain, sees the return of Bruno Thiry, but for the team managed by Malcolm Wilson it will be a double retirement with Kankkunen going off the road and mechanical failure on Thiry's Escort. In Corsica, the Belgian Thiry proves to be very fast but due to some errors, the race on Napoleon's island relegates the Belgian to fifth place, while Kankkunen only finishes ninth.

In the next two races, Argentina and Greece, Kankkunen finished in third place, while Thiry was forced to retire in both races due to engine failure. In New Zealand Thiry crashes off the road while Kankkunen is 4th. After Kankkunen's 3rd place in Finland, the season proceeds quietly for the two Ford drivers. But in the last race of the season, the RAC Rally, Kankkunen and Thiry obtained the 2nd and 3rd position respectively, finishing perfectly the career of the glorious Escort in rallying.

WRC victories

WRC results

References

External links

 Results at ewrc-results.com

Ford Rally Sport vehicles
World Rally Cars
World Rally championship-winning cars